Ilmenau is a river south of Hamburg, in Lower Saxony, Germany.

It is a left tributary of the Elbe near Winsen (Luhe).

The largest towns along the Ilmenau are Uelzen and Lüneburg. The city Ilmenau in Thuringia is not along the river Ilmenau but along the river Ilm. The river is navigable from Lüneburg, but almost exclusively used by excursion ships. Above Lüneburg, the river is popular with canoeists.

See also
List of rivers of Lower Saxony

References

 
Rivers of Lower Saxony
Federal waterways in Germany
Rivers of Germany